Holdin' a Good Hand is the ninth studio album by American country music singer Lee Greenwood. The album was released on July 10, 1990, by Capitol Records.

Track listing

Charts

References

1990 albums
Lee Greenwood albums
Capitol Records albums
Albums produced by Jerry Crutchfield